Events in the year 1943 in Spain.

Incumbents
Caudillo: Francisco Franco

Events 

 14 April: Museum of the History of Barcelona was established

Births
April 24 – Andrés Gandarias, road bicycle racer (died 2018)
June 29 – Antoni Torres, footballer (died 2003)
August 5 – José Evangelista, composer (died 2023)
December 15 – Anna Balletbó i Puig,  journalist and politician

Deaths
 April 16 – Carlos Arniches, Spanish playwright (b. 1866)
 July 6 – Nazaria Ignacia March Mesa, Spanish-born Roman Catholic religious sister, canonized (b. 1889)
 July 20 – Maria Gay, Spanish opera singer (b. 1879)
July 21 – José Jurado de la Parra, Spanish journalist, poet and playwright (b. 1856)

See also
List of Spanish films of the 1940s

References

 
Years of the 20th century in Spain
1940s in Spain
Spain
Spain